Bertrana is a genus of Central and South American orb-weaver spiders first described by Eugen von Keyserling in 1884. It includes some of the smallest known araneid orb-weavers. Bertrana striolata females are 4.5 mm long or less. The eight eyes are in two rows. The abdomen is white on top and on the sides, with multiple hieroglyphic-like lines and bars of many different shapes and length. In females, these are red, in males, black.

Species
 it contains twelve species:
Bertrana abbreviata (Keyserling, 1879) – Colombia
Bertrana arena Levi, 1989 – Costa Rica
Bertrana benuta Levi, 1994 – Colombia
Bertrana elinguis (Keyserling, 1883) – Ecuador, Peru, Brazil, French Guiana
Bertrana laselva Levi, 1989 – Costa Rica
Bertrana nancho Levi, 1989 – Peru
Bertrana planada Levi, 1989 – Colombia, Ecuador
Bertrana poa Levi, 1994 – Ecuador
Bertrana rufostriata Simon, 1893 – Venezuela, Brazil
Bertrana striolata Keyserling, 1884 – Costa Rica to Argentina
Bertrana urahua Levi, 1994 – Ecuador
Bertrana vella Levi, 1989 – Panama, Colombia

References

Araneidae
Araneomorphae genera
Spiders of Central America
Spiders of South America
Taxa named by Eugen von Keyserling